The 2011 Eastern Washington Eagles football team represented Eastern Washington University in the 2011 NCAA Division I FCS football season. The team was coached by Beau Baldwin, who was in his fourth season with Eastern Washington. The Eagles played their home games at Roos Field in Cheney, Washington and are a member of the Big Sky Conference. The Eagles entered the 2011 season as defending national champions.

The Eagles finished the season 6–5, 5–3 in Big Sky play to finish in a tie for third place.

Schedule

Source: Official schedule

References

Eastern Washington
Eastern Washington Eagles football seasons
Eastern Washington Eagles football